Glanerbeek is a river of North Rhine-Westphalia, Germany and Overijssel, Netherlands. It flows into the Dinkel near Losser. As part of the Rhine basin, specifically the Deltarhine region it is managed under the Deltarhine regime; it has been found to be the only river that the regime has contributed to problem solving for, in regards to the issue of river restoration.

See also
List of rivers of North Rhine-Westphalia

References

Rivers of North Rhine-Westphalia
Rivers of Overijssel
Rivers of the Netherlands
Rivers of Germany
Germany–Netherlands border
International rivers of Europe
Border rivers